Jean-Pierre Brucato (7 April 1944 – 1998) was a French football player who played for Racing Paris, Rennes, AC Ajaccio, Stade Reims, Angers SCO and Thouars Foot 79.

After retiring as a player, Brucato enjoyed a career as a manager with Stade Briochin and Olympique Alès.

References

1944 births
1998 deaths
French footballers
Racing Club de France Football players
Stade Rennais F.C. players
AC Ajaccio players
Stade de Reims players
Angers SCO players
Ligue 1 players
Ligue 2 players
French football managers
Thouars Foot 79 players
Association football defenders